Dhanusa may refer to:

 Dhanusa District, Nepal
 Dhanusha (unit)